Roberto Romeo (born 27 April 1990) is an Italian professional footballer who plays for Romanian club Csíkszereda Miercurea Ciuc as a full back or a winger.

References

External links 

1990 births
Living people
Italian footballers
Association football defenders
Serie C players
Liga I players
Liga II players
U.S. Catanzaro 1929 players
CS Gaz Metan Mediaș players
FC Universitatea Cluj players
FK Csíkszereda Miercurea Ciuc players
Italian expatriate footballers
Expatriate footballers in Romania
Italian expatriate sportspeople in Romania